The Museum of Modern Art of Algiers (MaMa) is an art museum in Algiers. It was inaugurated in 2007.

History  
The building, built between 1901 and 1909,  was first used as a department store, the Galeries de France. Its architecture is neo-moorish. It was rehabilitated to host the museum on five levels.

The MaMa was opened at the occasion of the operation "Algiers, capital of the Arabic culture 2007". It was supported by the ministry of Culture, Khalida Toumi. The museum is located at the number 25 of the street Larbi Ben M'hidi (formerly rue d'Isly).

Curators 
The current curator is Mohamed Djehiche, an art historian.

Exhibitions 
The MaMa presented a retrospective on  Olivier Debré (May–August 2010) and a tribute to  M'hamed Issiakhem (December 2010 – January 2011).

See also 
 List of museums in Algeria

References 

moorish
Art museums and galleries in Algeria
Museums in Algiers
2007 establishments in Algeria
Arab art scene